Mürsəqulu (also, Myursagulu and Mursa-Kuli) is a village in the Neftchala Rayon of Azerbaijan. The village forms part of the municipality of Xol Qaraqaşlı.

References 

Populated places in Neftchala District